Allan Louis Neville Jay MBE (born 30 June 1931) is a British former five-time-Olympian foil and épée fencer, and world champion.

Early life
Jay was born in London, England, and is Jewish. His father died fighting in World War II in 1943. He attended Cheltenham College from 1944 to 1948. He spent much of his childhood in Australia. After 1950 he returned to Britain to study law at the University of Oxford, and later worked as a solicitor while serving as fencing official with the Fédération Internationale d'Escrime. Jay and his wife Carole have two children.

Fencing career
Jay competed internationally in 1950 for Australia. He was a five times British champion winning five titles at the British Fencing Championships, épée champion in 1952, 1959, 1960, and 1961, and foil champion in 1963. Jay competed in five Olympics in both épée and foil, winning silver medals at the 1960 Rome Olympics in individual and team épée. He was Great Britain's flag bearer in the 1964 Olympic Games.

At the World Fencing Championships, Jay won a bronze medal in team foil in 1955, a bronze medal in individual foil in 1957, and a gold medal in individual foil while also winning a silver medal in individual épée in 1959, becoming the first British world champion in foil and the last fencer to win two individual medals in one year.

He won a gold medal in epee at the 1950 Maccabiah Games. He won three gold medals while fencing both foil and épée (where he won the gold medal in 1953, defeating American Ralph Goldstein in the final) at each of the 1953 Maccabiah Games and the 1957 Maccabiah Games. He is a member of the International Jewish Sports Hall of Fame, having been elected in 1985.

See also
List of athletes with the most appearances at Olympic Games
List of select Jewish fencers

References

External links

Commonwealth Games medals
Jewish Sports bio
Jews in Sports bio
Jewish Sports Legends bio

1931 births
Living people
British male fencers
Australian male fencers
Jewish male épée fencers
Jewish male foil fencers
English Jews
Olympic fencers of Great Britain
Fencers at the 1952 Summer Olympics
Fencers at the 1956 Summer Olympics
Fencers at the 1960 Summer Olympics
Fencers at the 1964 Summer Olympics
Fencers at the 1968 Summer Olympics
Olympic silver medallists for Great Britain
Olympic medalists in fencing
Fencers at the 1950 British Empire Games
Fencers at the 1954 British Empire and Commonwealth Games
Fencers at the 1958 British Empire and Commonwealth Games
Fencers at the 1962 British Empire and Commonwealth Games
Fencers at the 1966 British Empire and Commonwealth Games
Commonwealth Games gold medallists for Australia
Commonwealth Games gold medallists for England
Commonwealth Games silver medallists for England
Commonwealth Games bronze medallists for England
Members of the Order of the British Empire
Sportspeople from London
International Jewish Sports Hall of Fame inductees
Medalists at the 1960 Summer Olympics
Jewish British sportspeople
Maccabiah Games medalists in fencing
Maccabiah Games gold medalists for Great Britain
Competitors at the 1950 Maccabiah Games
Competitors at the 1953 Maccabiah Games
Competitors at the 1957 Maccabiah Games
Commonwealth Games medallists in fencing
People educated at Cheltenham College
Alumni of the University of Oxford
English solicitors
English Olympic medallists
Medallists at the 1950 British Empire Games
Medallists at the 1954 British Empire and Commonwealth Games
Medallists at the 1958 British Empire and Commonwealth Games
Medallists at the 1962 British Empire and Commonwealth Games
Medallists at the 1966 British Empire and Commonwealth Games